The 1930 TCU Horned Frogs football team represented Texas Christian University (TCU) as a member the Southwest Conference (SWC) during the 1930  college football season. Led by second-year head coach Francis Schmidt, the Horned Frogs compiled and overall record of 9–2–1 overall with a mark of 4–2 in conference play, placing third. TCU hosted their first two home game as Clark Field, before moving to the newly-constructed Amon G. Carter Stadium for their game with Arkansas on October 11.

Schedule

References

TCU
TCU Horned Frogs football seasons
TCU Horned Frogs football